Louise Mortensen (born December 11, 1979, in Aalborg, Denmark) is a former Danish handballer.

The last club she played for was Aalborg DH and previously she played for Team Esbjerg. She participated in the World Championships in 2005 and 2009. She played 97 national games and scored 205 with the Danish national team.

She stopped her careerby December 29, 2009.

External links 
 Louise Mortensen stops career, politiken.dk 

Danish female handball players
Sportspeople from Aalborg
1979 births
Living people